Siarhei Mikhalok (born January 19, 1972, Sergey Mikhalok) is a Belarusian rock musician and actor. He was the frontman of the ska punk band Lyapis Trubetskoy that he dissolved on September 1, 2014. He was the frontman of the band Brutto, now leads Drezden.

Born into a family of a Soviet military man in Dresden, East Germany. The family was originally from Minsk. He grew up in Siberia.

He graduated from the Belarusian State Academy of Arts.

In 1990, he created the rock band Lyapis Trubetskoy. Siarhey Mikhalok also worked in a theatre and as art director of a reggae club in Minsk. In 2000, he became a member of the comic duo Sasha i Sirozha. Since 2003 he has worked with Liavon Volski's music project Krambambula.

Since May 2015, Mikhalok has been an official permanent resident of Ukraine. He had already lived in Ukraine since December 2014.

References

1972 births
Living people
People from Dresden
Belarusian rock musicians
Belarusian State Academy of Arts alumni
20th-century Belarusian male singers
21st-century Belarusian male singers
Russian-language singers
Belarusian expatriates in Ukraine
Ukrainian rock musicians